La scuola più bella del mondo is a 2014 Italian comedy film directed by Luca Miniero.

Cast
Christian De Sica as Principal Filippo Brogi
Rocco Papaleo as Professor Gerardo Gergale
Angela Finocchiaro as Professor Wanda Pacini
Miriam Leone as Professor Margherita Rivolta
Lello Arena as Principal Arturo Moscariello
Massimo De Lorenzo as the Inspector
Roberto Farnesi as Principal Virgilio Neri
Ubaldo Pantani as Assessor Duccio Burroni
Swami Caputo as Gaia
Nicola Rignanese as Augusto Soreda
Nadia Aldridge as Lady Coleridge
Giulia Mombelli as Mrs. Ghioni

References

External links

2014 films
Films directed by Luca Miniero
2010s Italian-language films
2014 comedy films
Italian comedy films
2010s Italian films